The Philippines has competed in ten editions of the AFC Women's Asian Cup, the top tournament for women's national teams organized by members of the Asian Football Confederation. The Philippine first competed in 1981, when the tournament was still known as the "AFC Women's Championship". The national team competed again in 1983 before skipping the next three editions.

From 1993 to 2003, the Philippines participated in the tournament but failed to progress beyond the group stage. For the 2006 edition the tournament a qualification phase was introduced and the competition was renamed as the "AFC Women's Asian Cup". The Philippines unsuccessfully attempted to qualify for the 2006, 2008, 2014 editions while it did not enter the qualifiers for the 2010 edition.

The Philippines then qualified for the 2018 edition which was hosted in Jordan. In this edition they advanced out of the group stage for the first time and finished sixth. They then qualified for the subsequent 2022 edition in India where they finished as one of the semifinalists – consequentially qualifying for their first ever FIFA Women's World Cup to be held in 2023.

AFC Women's Championship (1975–2003)

1981 in Hong Kong

The 1981 AFC Women's Championship which was hosted in Hong Kong, then a British Overseas Territory, marked the Philippines first participation in Asia's top women's national teams tournament. Full matches had a duration of 60 minutes. The Philippine national team was mentored by Edward Magallona and had Cristy Ramos as its captain. They were part of Group A in the group stage together with India, Singapore, and Hong Kong. The national team finished last in their group and failed to advance to the semifinal. They only scoring a single goal while conceding 14 goals in three matches.

1983 in Thailand

The 1983 AFC Women's Championship which was hosted in Bangkok, Thailand saw six national teams participating. The competing teams were part of a single group in the group stage matches. Though the team failed to qualify at least for the third place play-off, it was in this edition that the Philippines recorded their first win in the history of the tournament by winning 2-0 over Hong Kong. Laudeth Gonzales scored at least a goal in that match.

1993 in Malaysia

The Philippines returned to the AFC Women's Asian Championships after not participating in 1986 and 1991. The 1993 edition was hosted in Kuching, Malaysia They were part of Group B with Hong Kong, Japan, and Chinese Taipei. The Philippines finish last in their group conceding 32 goals and did not manage to score a goal. The national team suffered losses with double-digit margins against Japan and Chinese Taipei.

1995 in Malaysia

The 1995 edition of the Asian Championships was hosted in Malaysia again; this time in Kota Kinabalu. The Philippines were part of Group A together with China, Hong Kong, and Kazakhstan. The Philippines suffered a 0-21 defeat to China, loss 0-2 to Hong Kong but managed to make a goalless draw with Kazakhstan.

1997 in China

The 1997 edition was hosted by China with matches of Group B, the grouping which the Philippines was a part of, were played in Guangzhou. The hosts were also part of this group, along with North Korea and Uzbekistan. The Philippines again finished last in their group, conceding 32 goals but scored a goal apiece against North Korea and Uzbekistan.

1999 in the Philippines

The Philippines hosted the 1999 AFC Women's Championship with games played in Bacolod and Iloilo City. The host nation played matches in Iloilo City as a team which was part of Group B. They started their campaign with a 5-0 win against Nepal but loss their following matches against Uzbekistan, Japan, and Thailand and finished fourth among five teams in their group just a place ahead of Nepal.

2001 in Taiwan

The Philippines were grouped with China, Uzbekistan, and Hong Kong in Group B in the tournament hosted in Taiwan. They lost all three games scoring only a single goal against Hong Kong. The opposing teams scored 17 goals against the Philippines.

2003 in Thailand

Thailand hosted the 2003 AFC Women's Championship and the Philippines were grouped with five teams in Group B. They lost their first three matches against Japan, Myanmar, and Chinese Taipei. Their 2-1 win over Guam was their fourth and final match in this edition.

AFC Women's Asian Cup (2006–)

2018 in Jordan

The Philippines qualified for the AFC Women's Asian Cup for the first time a qualification process was introduced in the tournament which was known as the AFC Women's Championship prior to the 2006 edition.

Group stage – Group A

The national team was part of Group A. They had to finish among the top two teams in their group to advance to the semifinals and qualify for the 2019 FIFA Women's World Cup in France and if they finished third they had to face the third-placing team from the other group for fifth place and the fifth and last berth to qualify for the World Cup. They won 2–1 against hosts Jordan in their first group stage match though they lost their next matches against China and Thailand. They finished third in their group and progressed to the fifth place playoff.

Knock-out stage – Fifth place match

They lost 0–5 to South Korea in their last bid to qualify for the 2019 FIFA Women's World Cup.

2022 in India

The Philippines qualified for the 2022 Women's Asian Cup in September 2021. Former Australia coach Alen Stajčić was appointed to lead the national team in the Asian Cup. As part of their preparations, a two month training camp was held in the United States which started in November 2021. 

The COVID-19 pandemic was prevailing at the time of the tournament and relevant protocols made some players unavailable for certain matches. Sarina Bolden had to be isolated for the Thailand match due to COVID-19 protocols. Quinley Quezada and Inna Palacios were unavailable for the Australia match, one of which were due to injury and another due to COVID-19 protocols. Coach Stajčić confirmed that some players along with a staff member tested positive for COVID-19 but the identities of these individuals were not explicitly disclosed.

Group stage – Group B
The Philippines were drawn to Group B with Australia, Thailand, and Indonesia. The team started the group stage with an upset 1–0 win against Thailand. It was the Philippines first win against Thailand in twelve matches. This was followed by a 0–4 lost to Australia despite holding the opposition to a scoreless draw at halftime.
The Philippines would later take on Indonesia for match day 3 of the group stage. The Malditas shutout Indonesia with a final of 6–0 to advance to the knockout stage quarter finals.
 

 Knockout stage – Quarterfinals
The Philippines was on the verge of qualifying for their first FIFA Women's World Cup. Winning over Chinese Taipei, their quarterfinal opponents, would secure them an outright berth for the 2023 edition which is co-hosted by Australia and New Zealand. Failing to do so would relegate them to the repechage where they could still qualify for the world cup or advance to the inter-confederation play-offs. The Philippines and Chinese Taipei settled for a 1–1 draw and a penalty shoot-out had to be held to determine the team which would advance to the semifinals. The Philippines bested their opposition to clinch a place in the 2023 FIFA Women's World Cup.

 Knockout stage – Semifinals

Record

Tournament summary

Head to head records

References

Women's Asian Cup
AFC Women's Asian Cup